Zadnistrianske  is a village of Ivano-Frankivsk Raion in Ivano-Frankivsk Oblast, Ukraine. It belongs to Burshtyn urban hromada, one of the hromadas of Ukraine. The village's population is about 1,000 inhabitants.

Until 18 July 2020, Zadnistrianske belonged to Halych Raion. The raion was abolished in July 2020 as part of the administrative reform of Ukraine, which reduced the number of raions of Ivano-Frankivsk Oblast to six. The area of Halych Raion was merged into Ivano-Frankivsk Raion.

Gallery

References

Villages in Ivano-Frankivsk Raion